Xu Shaoyang (born 9 February 1983) is a Chinese discus thrower. Her personal best is 63.29 metres, achieved in October 2008 in Shijiazhuang.

She was born in Shandong. She was very successful as a teenager, as she won the gold medal at the 2000 World Junior Championships and the silver medal at the 2002 World Junior Championships. Her personal best as a teenager was 62.54 metres, achieved in October 2002 in Bangkok.

In 2003, she won the bronze medals at the 2003 Asian Championships and at the 2003 Summer Universiade. At the 2007 Asian Championships she won the gold medal. She also competed at the 2009 World Championships without reaching the final.

Competition record

References

1983 births
Living people
Chinese female discus throwers
Athletes from Shandong
Universiade medalists in athletics (track and field)
Universiade bronze medalists for China
Medalists at the 2003 Summer Universiade
21st-century Chinese women